Gao-Yang, or Gao-Lei or Gao-Yu, is one of four principal Yue Chinese languages. It is spoken in around Maoming and Yangjiang in southwestern Guangdong.

The name derives from its two dialects, Gaozhou and Yangjiang.

References

Yue Chinese